Y-Factor is a TV show aired in Cyprus in Summer and Autumn 2011. The show's season finale will be held in August 2012.
The show was renewed for a second season and the auditions will be held in the end of October and the beginning of November. The judges will return for the second season.

The winner gets a record contract worth €7,000,000

The show had/will have a variety of guest judges including Amy Lee (Evanescence), Simon Cowell, Freddie Mercury and Carrie Underwood

The show airs every Saturday and Sunday

Format 
The candidates auditioned in front of producers and later in front of the judges.
Later they competed against each other at the bootcamp round. The judges select their own contestants and go and perform at the live stage.
After weeks and weeks of live competition, only 1 wins.

Auditions 
55000 hopefuls auditioned in 5 different cities. Auditions took place between 10th and 20 March in big halls. Only 500 made it to the next round.

Bootcamp 
The 500 people who made it competed in 3 different levels, in which by the end only 12 made it to the live shows.
The 3 levels which the contestants were tested on were as follows:

Groups
The contestants are asked to sing their hearts off in groups of 5. Only 200 of the 500 made it to the next round

Dance ability
The contestants are asked to sing and dance at the same time. Only 50 made to the next round

Stage presence
Each 50 contestants are given 2 minutes to show all they have. 12 people who make the live show are revealed.
(The list of the 12 people and their mentors can be found below)

Judges and presenters 
Judges:
 Ozzy Damian
 Erroman Betacourt
 Marc Eagleman

Presenter:
 Mertez

Contestants

Team Erroman Betacourt 
 Giannis Pillardis (Eliminated-12th place)
 Marina Lamaristi (Eliminated-10th place)
 Ayse Ar

Team Ozzy Damian 
 Stavroulla Lingiri
 Ilayda Ilgec (Eliminated-11th place)
 Berk Bilgili (Eliminated-7th place)
 Emre Berkay

Team Marc Eagleman 
 Meryem Uzun
 Yiannis Koprudis (Eliminated-9th place)
 Maria Sarakkis (Eliminated-8th place)

Cypriot reality television series
2012 Cypriot television series debuts
2012 Cypriot television series endings